Reginald Valentine Ward (14 February 1902 – 1 May 1968) was an English cricketer. Ward was a right-handed batsman. He was born at Biggleswade, Bedfordshire.

Ward made his debut in county cricket for Bedfordshire against Oxfordshire at Bedford School in the 1929 Minor Counties Championship. He played minor counties cricket for Bedfordshire from 1929 to 1939, making a total of 48 appearances for the county, the last of which came against Cambridgeshire at Wardown Park, Luton. In 1931, he was selected to represent a combined Minor Counties cricket team in a first-class match against the touring New Zealanders at the Rose Brothers Ground, Gainsborough. Winning the toss and electing to bat first, the Minor Counties made 191 all out, with Ward the last man out, dismissed for 4 by Cyril Allcott. The New Zealanders then made 361/8 declared in their first-innings, during which Ward took the wickets of Lindsay Weir and Tom Lowry to finish with figures of 2/77 from 25 overs. The Minor Counties reached 115/3 in their second-innings, at which point the match was declared a draw.

He died at Yeovil, Somerset, on 1 May 1968.

References

External links
Reginald Ward at ESPNcricinfo
Reginald Ward at CricketArchive

1902 births
1968 deaths
People from Biggleswade
English cricketers
Bedfordshire cricketers
Minor Counties cricketers